Edvard Grieg in Jazz Mood by Kjell Karlsen Big Band is an album released in 2008 by Universal Music

Reception 
The review of the Norwegian newspaper Dagbladet awarded the album dice 4.

Track listing 
«Air, Suite From Holberg's» (04:48)
«Anitra's Dance» (03:23)
«At Rondane» (03:04)
«Gavotte, Suite From Holberg's» (03:34)
«Goodnight Song for Dobbin» (05:12)
«I Love But Thee» (04:39)
«In the Hall of the Mountain King» (03:30)
«Last Spring» (04:25)
«Morning Mood» (03:04)
«Norwegian Dance no. 2» (04:20)
«Prelude, Suite From Holberg's» (05:48)
«Sarabande, Suite From Holberg's» (06:22)
«Solveig's Song» (04:54)
«Time Doesn't Heal» (03:30)
«Wedding Day at Trollhaugen» (03:38)

Credits 
Vocals: Pitsj Ensamble, Bjørn Johan Muri, Carsten Loly, Heidi Ruud Ellingsen, Kåre Conradi, Torun Eriksen
Arrangers: Bjørn Jørgensen, Magnus Blom, Dag S. Arnesen, Even Kruse Skatrud, Hans Mathisen, Håvard Fossum, Johan Alenius, Kjell Karlsen, Staffan William-Olsson, Øivind Westby
Musicians: Børge-Are Halvorsen, Dag Arnesen, Frank Brodahl, Knut Riisnæs, Staffan William-Olsson
Composers: Edvard Grieg, Kjell Karlsen
Transelators: W.H. Halverson, Rolf Kristian Stang
Text writer: Hans Christian Andersen, Mike McGurk, Aasmund Olavsson Vinje
Orchestra: Kjell Karlsen Big Band

References 

2008 live albums
Jazz albums by Norwegian artists